Raphitoma eberti is an extinct species of sea snail, a marine gastropod mollusc in the family Raphitomidae.

Description
The shell reaches a length of 7 mm.

Distribution
Fossils of this extinct marine species were found in Eocene strata in Dnipropetrovsk, Ukraine.

References

 Koenen, A. von 1894: Das Norddeutsche Unter-Oligocän und seine Mollusken-Fauna. Abh. geol. Spec.-Karte Preuss. u. Thüring. Staat. 10 (6), 1250–1392

eberti
Gastropods described in 1894